This list includes SQL reserved words – aka SQL reserved keywords, as the SQL:2016 specifies and some RDBMSs have added.

A dash (-) means that the keyword is not reserved.

See also
 SQL
 SQL syntax
 List of relational database management systems

References 

SQL
SQL reserved words